Richard Pieris and Company (ARPICO) established in 1940 it is one of Sri Lanka's largest conglomerates with interests in manufacturing, engineering, retail and plantation industries. It is a pioneer in the tyre, plantation and rubber industries of Sri Lanka. With a staff strength of more than 25,000, the company's major brands include Arpitec, Arpidag and Arpico.

History
The company was founded in 1932 as a partnership initially dealing with the plantation and tire industries. Initially it started as a family business. The founder member of the company Mr Richard Pieris. Since then it has diversified into the areas of manufacturing, pumps, retail and engineering sectors. The company also pioneered the concept of hypermarkets in Sri Lanka through their 'Arpico Super Centre' chain. Today the company has more than 1000 retail outlets including dealerships and factories islandwide.

Ownership Change
The Pieris family's stake in Richard Pieris as well as other large blocks of the company's shares were acquired by Dr Sena Yaddehige and related parties in a hard-fought take over in 2002–2004.

Industry sectors

Rubber
The company is engaged in the manufacture of moulded, extruded and foam rubber both for the export and domestic markets. Major markets include North America, Europe and the Middle East. The division conforms to ISO 9002 standards.

Tires
Richard Piries Company is the market leader and the pioneer in the tyre Retread industry of Sri Lanka and commands a market share of nearly 60%. In addition to that, it has become the largest Retreader in the whole of South Asia which is a remarkable achievement for a Sri Lankan company. The company is associated with Bandag Corporation – USA and Birla Group India.

Plantations
The group is one of the largest players in the plantation industry with ownership of major plantation companies including Maskeliya Plantations PLC, Namunukula Plantations PLC and Kegalle Plantations PLC. The sector employs more than 24,000 people combined.

Retail
With its retail arm ‘Arpico Supercentre’ the company is the largest retailer of general household products in Sri Lanka. The company pioneered the concept of Hypermarkets in Sri Lanka.

References

External links
 Official website

Conglomerate companies of Sri Lanka
1940 establishments in Ceylon
Companies listed on the Colombo Stock Exchange